Betsy Talbot Blackwell (1905 – February 4, 1985) was an editor of several women's magazines, best known for being the editor-in-chief of Mademoiselle from 1937–71.

Biography
Blackwell was born in New York City to Hayden Talbot, a playwright and author, and Benedict B. Talbot, a stylist. She was educated at St. Elizabeth's Academy, a Catholic girls' school, though she was not a Catholic. Blackwell began her career as an assistant fashion editor at Charm magazine from 1923–1928, afterwards becoming a fashion editor at Mademoiselle under the assumed name of Elizabeth Rich. From 1937 until her retirement in 1971, she served as the editor-in-chief of the magazine.

During her tenure at Mademoiselle, Blackwell oversaw increased circulation—from 178,000 in 1939 to 540,000 in 1953 to nearly a million in 1971—a change in focus towards young career women and the introduction of a literary aspect to the magazine. Many well-known authors were published in Mademoiselle during her time as editor-in-chief, including Eudora Welty, Truman Capote, William Faulkner, and Joyce Carol Oates. During her editorship, the magazine started the practice of allowing college women to write and publish an issue each summer. The summer guest editorship program included Sylvia Plath, Joan Didion, Mona Simpson, Ann Beattie, Francine du Plessix Gray, Meg Wolitzer, Betsey Johnson, Ali MacGraw, and Diane Johnson.

She died in 1985 while being treated for emphysema. She was survived by her son and stepdaughter through her marriage to James Madison Blackwell. Papers relating to her life, including her personal and professional correspondence, along with her work at Mademoiselle, were bequeathed by her husband to the American Heritage Center, operated by the University of Wyoming.

Awards
In 1942, she received the Neiman Marcus Fashion Award for her contributions to fashion, and in 1949 became the first woman to be elected to the board of New York publisher Street & Smith.

References

External links
Betsy Talbot Blackwell Papers at the American Heritage Center, University of Wyoming.

Further reading

1905 births
1985 deaths
American women journalists
American magazine editors
Journalists from New York City
20th-century American women writers
20th-century American journalists
Women magazine editors